The American Rare Breed Association (ARBA) is a kennel club for owners and fanciers of dog breeds and types not recognised by the American Kennel Club.

References 

Dog breed registries